Acidota is a genus of beetles belonging to the family Staphylinidae.

The genus was described in 1829 by James Francis Stephens.

The species of this genus are found in Eurasia and Northern America.

Species:
 Acidota canaliculatus
 Acidota sulcatus

References

Omaliinae